Sankt Pankraz is a comune (municipality) in South Tyrol in northern Italy, located about  northwest of the city of Bolzano.

Geography

Sankt Pankraz borders the following municipalities: Lana, Laurein, Naturns, 
Unsere Liebe Frau im Walde-St. Felix, Tisens, Ulten, and Castelfondo.

History

Coat-of-arms
The emblem represents a tower with battlements, with a pavilion azure roof, surrounded by a wall above a vert hill with two fir-trees on each side on argent. The castle tower corresponds to the Eschenloch Castle built in the twelfth century by the Counts of Ulten. The emblem was adopted in 1968.

Society

Linguistic distribution
According to the 2011 census, 98.84% of the population spoke German, 0.96% Italian and 0.19% Ladin as their first language.

Demographic evolution

References

External links

 Homepage of the municipality

Municipalities of South Tyrol
Nonsberg Group